The Engineer Regiment is a regiment in the Royal Danish Army with base in Skive in Jutland. The soldiers of this regiment are trained in skills such as shooting, blasting, setting up camp, and much more. The engineer troops are also trained to fight alongside infantry regiments in combat zones if needed.

This regiment was formed by the amalgamation of nearly all of the Danish military engineering corps into one regiment in 1997, simply named Ingeniørregimentet. The core of the Danish combat engineers are the so-called armored engineers. These units usually work in detached squads, each under the command of and attached to an infantry company, and equipped with an M113. Their roles are combat demolition, minefield clearing, basic mine laying and EOR. They are also extensively trained as infantry, to support the ordinary troops in combat. Besides these units, the regiment has the different work fields of combat engineers (construction, EOD, CBRN) spread out over different companies.

Structure
Today the Engineer Regiment has three battalions:
  1st Armored Engineer Battalion (1 PNIGBTN)
  Staff Company
  1st Armored Engineer Company
  2nd Armored Engineering Company
   3rd Armored Engineering Company
  2nd Explosive Ordnance Disposal Battalion (2 EODBTN)
  5th EOD Company (5 EODKMP)
  6th Army Basic Training Company (6 HBUKMP)
  7th Army Basic Training Company (7 HBUKMP)
  Engineer Training Company
  3rd CBRN & Construction Battalion (3 CBRN & KONSTBTN)
  3rd Construction Company (3 KONSTKMP)
  4th CBRN & Geospatial Company (4 CBRN-&GEOKMP)

See also
 Royal Danish Army

References

Danish Army regiments
Engineer regiments
Military of Denmark